is a Japanese industrialist who is the founder and chairman of Konami, a Japanese entertainment company. He is also known as Kaz Kozuki.

Career 
Kagemasa Kōzuki founded Konami Industry Co., Ltd. in 1969. The company began manufacturing amusement machines for arcades in 1973.

References 

1940 births
Living people
Japanese video game businesspeople
Japanese billionaires
Japanese company founders
Japanese inventors
Kansai University alumni
Konami people
People from Osaka